Brigadier Mustansir Billah is a former general of the Pakistan Army. He was sentenced to 14 years imprisonment for being party to an attempted coup d'état in 1995 against the civilian government of Benazir Bhutto while he was still a serving Brigadier general. No political party was linked to this coup attempt as determined by the courts.

Brigadier Mustansar Billah, Deputy Military Secretary at GHQ was the alleged mastermind behind the 1995 Pakistani coup d'etat attempt.

Military career
In 1995, he plotted a coup against the Government of Benazir Bhutto along with Major General Zahirul Islam Abbasi. The coup named Operation Khalifa aimed at taking over the GHQ at the time of a Corps Commanders’ Conference, by eliminating key commanders, and then taking over the country with the ultimate objective of imposing a Taliban-style Sunni government.

Imprisonment and release
After the coup failed, He was court-martialed and imprisoned for 14 years in 1995 and released in 2009.

See also
 1995 Pakistani coup d'état attempt
 Zia-ul-Haq's Islamization
 Benazir Bhutto
 Islamism
 History of Pakistan
 Pakistani Armed Forces

References

Pakistani generals
Pakistan Army personnel who were court-martialed
Pakistani military attachés
Living people
Year of birth missing (living people)